Star Hawks was a comic strip created by Ron Goulart and Gil Kane, first published on October 3, 1977, that ran through May 2, 1981. It was written through April 1979 by Goulart, followed by Archie Goodwin (1979-1980), Roger McKenzie (1980-1981) and Roger Stern (writing assist, 1979). Comics veteran Gil Kane provided the artwork, with uncredited help (during a period of illness on Kane's part) from Ernie Colón and Howard Chaykin. 

Kane received the National Cartoonist Society Story Comic Strip Award for 1977 for his work on the strip.

Goulart also wrote two Star Hawks prose novels: Empire 99 and The Cyborg King.

Publication history
In 1978, shortly after the launch of the strip, Kane recalled its genesis:

Format
The daily strip was unique in that initially it was two-tier: each daily was twice as large as the normal daily strip.  This format allowed artist Kane great flexibility in layout. Many papers were reluctant to devote so much space to a single strip. It changed to a single tier as of July 30, 1979.

The strip ran daily and Sunday for three and a half years, for a total of 1,252 strips.

Reprints
The strip from the start was run in The Menomonee Falls Gazette. Ace/Tempo published two paperback black and white reprint volumes. Blackthorne Publishing produced four issues in comic book format of black and white reprints. Early issues of Amazing Heroes carried reprints of the strip. All of these reprint series omitted occasional bridging strips (the first two strips, which set the tone for the series, were most often not reprinted). In 2004 Hermes Press released the entire run of the strip in a single volume. IDW Publishing reprinted the complete series—dailies and Sundays—in 2017–2018, in three volumes.

References

External links
Star Hawks at Don Markstein's Toonopedia. Archived from the original on October 23, 2017.

American comic strips
Science fiction comics
1977 comics debuts
1981 comics endings